Esterhazy Airport  is located  south-west of Esterhazy, Saskatchewan, Canada.

See also 
List of airports in Saskatchewan

References

External links
Page about this airport on COPA's Places to Fly airport directory
"New asphalt at airport", article in the Miner-Journal newspaper, Esterhazy, SK

Registered aerodromes in Saskatchewan
Fertile Belt No. 183, Saskatchewan